The Prosecution of Offences Act 1884 was an act of the United Kingdom Parliament. Its main purpose was to modify the original Prosecution of Offences Act 1879, merging the roles of Director of Public Prosecutions and Treasury Solicitor (Section 2), though it also put in place a requirement for Commissioners and Assistant Commissioners and District Superintendents of the Metropolitan Police, Commissioners of the City of London Police, Chief Constables and the heads of every other county, city and borough police forces in England to report to the Director (Sections 3–4). Its Section 2 was itself repealed by the Prosecution of Offences Act 1908, again splitting the two roles.

References

Prosecution services of the United Kingdom
United Kingdom Acts of Parliament 1884